William, Billy or Bill Wade may refer to:

Politicians
William Wade (Maldon MP), in 1410, MP for Maldon
William Wade (English politician) (1546–1623), English statesman and diplomat
William H. Wade (1835–1911), American politician, U.S. Representative from Missouri
Sir William Wade (lord mayor) (1849–1935), British politician, Lord Mayor of Bradford
Arthur Wade (William Arthur Wade, 1919–2014), Australian politician, member of the New South Wales Legislative Assembly
William Wade, Baron Wade of Chorlton (1932–2018), British politician, businessman and agriculturalist
Will Wade (Georgia politician), American politician from Georgia

Sports
Bill Wade (footballer) (1901–1958), English footballer
Billy Wade (cricketer) (1914–2003), South African cricketer
Bill Wade (1930–2016), American football quarterback
Billy Wade (racing driver) (1930–1965), American race car driver
Will Wade (born 1982), American college basketball coach

Others
William Wade (Canon of Windsor) (1672–1733), Irish Anglican priest
William Wade (Dean of Glasgow and Galloway) (died 1845), Scottish Episcopalian priest
Sir William Wade (legal scholar) (1918–2004), British academic lawyer
William Wade (journalist) (1918–2006), American war correspondent during World War II